Tina Abdulla (born 20 September 1997) is a Norwegian handball player for Storhamar HE.

Abdulla represented Norway at the 2015 Women's U-19 European Handball Championship in Spain, placing 6th.

Her last name is often misspelled as Abdula or Abdullah.

Achievements
Handball-Bundesliga Frauen:
Winner: 2020/21
REMA 1000-ligaen:
Bronze: 2018/19
Norwegian Cup:
Bronze: 2022/2023

References

1997 births
Living people
Norwegian female handball players
Norwegian expatriate sportspeople in Germany